Kapsalis is a surname. Notable people with the surname include:

 Effie Kapsalis (1971–2022), American open access advocate
 Marios Kapsalis (born 1999), Greek association football player
 Stelios Kapsalis (born 1994), Greek association football player
 Thomas H. Kapsalis (1925–2022), American abstract painter, sculptor and academic

See also 

 The Andreas Kapsalis Trio